Birgaon is a municipal corporation and a part of Raipur urban agglomeration in Raipur district in the state of Chhattisgarh, India.   

The town is known for famous Banjari Mata Temple.

Demographics
 India census, Birgaon had a population of 23,352. Males constitute 54% of the population and females 46%. Birgaon has an average literacy rate of 60%, higher than the national average of 59.5%; with male literacy of 70% and female literacy of 48%. 21% of the population is under 6 years of age.

References

Cities and towns in Raipur district